Animali In Calore Surriscaldati Con Ipertermia Genitale/Cat in Red is the name of the split record Fantômas and Melt-Banana released in 2005 through Italian record label, Unhip Records. It was released both on 5" vinyl and 3" CD. It is now presumably out of print and difficult to find. The Fantômas track is taken from the recording sessions that produced both of their previous releases, 2005's Suspended Animation and 2004's Delìrium Còrdia, the title of which roughly translates to "Animals In Heat Being Overheated By Genital Hyperthermia."

Track listing
Fantômas – "Animali In Calore Surriscaldati Con Ipertermia Genitale" – 0:44
Melt-Banana – "Cat In Red"

Personnel
Igort Tuveri – Artwork

Fantômas (band) albums
Melt-Banana albums
2005 EPs
Split EPs